Dwight Township is located in Livingston County, Illinois. As of the 2010 census, its population was 4,494 and it contained 1,961 housing units.

History
Dwight Township was named for Henry A. Dwight, Jr., of New York, as was the village of Dwight, Illinois.  He was a brother engineer of R. P. Morgan, who was the founder of the town.

Geography

Demographics

References

External links
US Census
City-data.com
Illinois State Archives

Townships in Livingston County, Illinois
Populated places established in 1857
Townships in Illinois
1857 establishments in Illinois